Elections to Brighton and Hove City Council on the south coast of England were held on 1 May 2003. The whole council (a unitary authority) was up for election and all 54 councillors were elected from 21 wards. Labour lost their majority on the council but continued to govern in a minority administration.

Following the election, the composition of the council was as follows:

Results

|}
 note: Socialist Alliance stood as Socialist Alliance Against The War

Ward Results

Brunswick and Adelaide

Central Hove

East Brighton

Goldsmid

Hangleton and Knoll

Hanover and Elm Grove

Hollingbury and Stanmer

Moulsecoomb and Bevendean

North Portslade

Patcham

Preston Park

Queen's Park

Regency

Rottingdean Coastal

South Portslade

Stanford

St Peter's and North Laine

Westbourne

Wish

Withdean

Woodingdean

References

2003 English local elections
2003
21st century in Brighton and Hove
2000s in East Sussex